Hello Venus (often stylized as HELLOVENUS) was a South Korean girl group formed by Tricell Media (formerly a joint venture between Pledis Entertainment and Fantagio). The group originally consisted of: Alice, Nara, Lime, Yooara, Yoonjo and Yooyoung. They debuted with the lead single "Venus" from their debut extended play of the same name on 9 May 2012. In July 2014, Fantagio and Pledis ended their Tricell Media joint ventures. Yooara and Yoonjo remained under Pledis, with the other four members continuing their group activities under Fantagio. In October 2014, Fantagio introduced two new members: Seoyoung and Yeoreum. The group officially disbanded in 2019, after all the members' contracts expired. The group is most notable for songs such as: "Sticky Sticky", "Wiggle Wiggle" and "I'm Ill".

History

Pre-debut activities
Pledis Entertainment collaborated with Fantagio Entertainment, an acting agency, for Hello Venus' showcase in April. Yoo Ara and Yoonjo were trainees of After School, both having performed on their first album Virgin and were originally intended to join the group. Yoo Ara, along with fellow Pledis trainees Kim Kyungmin and Nicole Yi, were the final three candidates to become After School's ninth member, but Noh Yi Young (now known as E-Young) was chosen instead. Lime was in the pre-debut line-up of a girl group called Viva Girls under Medialine Entertainment alongside Nine Muses member Gyeongree. However, the group disbanded, and the members left the company.

Lime was a backup dancer for Chae Yeon. She was also a rapper in Lee Jung's "들어봐 (Look At Me)" and Honey Family's "역전의 드라마 (Reversal of Drama)" under the name Haley.

Alice was previously a solo singer under the stage name of "Ora" and released the single "Naughty Face" in 2010. On 1 May 2018, it was announced that she had sued her former company for not giving her proper training and allegedly trying to force her to wear revealing outfits and perform in adult entertainment venues. The company argued that Alice had violated her contract and not carried out her schedule, but a judge ruled in Alice's favour, saying that the company could not provide any evidence to back up their claims.

The group was originally a seven-member line-up; consisting of the Alice, Nara, Yoo Ara, Yoonjo, Lime, Yooyoung and Nicole; however, Nicole departed Pledis shortly before Hello Venus's debut.

2012–2013: Debut with Venus, What Are You Doing Today? and Would You Stay for Tea?
Hello Venus first became known under the name Venus. On 17 April, Hello Venus was officially announced with a teaser image, along with the opening of an official website. The final group had six members, containing two members from Pledis: Yoo Ara and Yoonjo, and four members from Fantagio: Alice, Nara, Lime and Yooyoung. Hello Venus release their debut mini album, Venus on 9 May 2012, with a total of four tracks including the lead single of the same name.

Hello Venus continue to release new digital single, Like a Wave on 4 July 2012. The single was a part of re-release their debut mini album, Venus.

Hello Venus' second extended play What Are You Doing Today? was released on 12 December. The album contains five tracks, with the lead single of the same name.

Promotions for "What Are You Doing Today?" concluded on 27 January, however on 30 January, Tricell Media announced that the group would begin promoting their follow-up song, "Romantic Love" immediately, with the first performance on MBC Music's Show Champion the same day.

Hello Venus released their third extended play Would You Stay for Tea? on 2 May 2013, with a total of four tracks including the lead single of the same name. The following day, Tricell Media announced that the group will hold their first solo concert at Sogang University's Mary Hall on 22 June.

2014: Line-up changes and Sticky Sticky
It was announced on 31 July via Hello Venus' official Daum café that Pledis and Fantagio had decided to end the Hello Venus project. Alice, Nara, Lime, and Yooyoung would continue to promote as Hello Venus, while Yoo Ara and Yoonjo would return to Pledis, pursuing careers in acting and continue their careers in music. The remaining members would work on releasing a new album and would also be venturing into acting. Hello Venus was then managed solely by Fantagio.

On 16 September, the group's agency announced that they are scheduled to have a comeback sometime in the fall. The comeback was reported to be in collaboration with the Brave Brothers, as well as introducing a new member to the group. On 22 October, Fantagio introduced two new members: Seoyoung and Yeoreum, and announced that the group would be making their comeback with a single in the following month. A music video teaser for their upcoming single "Sticky Sticky" was released on 31 October, featuring all the members in a sexy concept. The song and music video was released on 6 November 2014.

2015: Wiggle Wiggle and I'm Ill

On 20 December 2014, Fantagio announced the group would have a comeback with their fifth digital single, "Wiggle Wiggle," produced by Brave Brothers. On 23 December 2014, the first teaser video was released. On 2 January 2015, Fantagio posted the first teaser images of the members. The official music video was released on 8 January 2015. The group released their fifth mini album, I'm Ill, on 22 July 2015, promoting the song of the same name.

2016–2019: Devine Channel collaboration, Mystery of Venus, and disbandment
On 5 May 2016 Fantagio announced that the group will have a comeback with a digital single called "Glow". The song is a collaboration with producing and writing team Devine Channel. On 6 May 2016 Fantagio posted the first teaser images of members, Nara, Yeoreum and Seoyoung. On 7 May 2016 Fantagio posted the second teaser images of members, Alice, Yooyoung and Lime. On 10 May, "Glow" was released as a digital single.

On 10 July, Fantagio announced that the group will be releasing a second collaboration song with Devine Channel, called "Paradise". The song was officially released on 18 July as a digital download and a music video for the song was released on the same day.

On 1 November, "Runway" was released as the final collaboration single with Devine Channel.

On 29 December 2016 it was reported that the group will be making a comeback with a mini-album on 11 January 2017. Mystery of Venus was released on 11 January 2017, in conjunction with the music video for the title track "Mysterious".

On 26 April 2019, it was confirmed that the group will disband after the members' contracts expired on 8 May 2019.

Endorsements
In October 2012, five months after their debut, Hello Venus became endorsement models for Bugs 3.0, a smartphone music application from Neowiz Internet.

Members
 Alice (앨리스) (2012–2019)
 Nara (나라) (2012–2019)
 Yoo Ara (유아라) (2012–2014)
 Yoonjo (윤조) (2012–2014)
 Lime (라임) (2012–2019)
 Seoyoung (서영) (2014–2019)
 Yooyoung (유영) (2012–2019)
 Yeoreum (여름) (2014–2019)

Discography

Extended plays

Reissues

Live albums

Single album

Singles

Promotional singles

Collaborations

Soundtrack appearances

Compilation appearances

Music videos

Filmography

Reality shows

Ambassadorships

Awards and nominations

References

External links

  on Fantagio 

 
2012 establishments in South Korea
K-pop music groups
Pledis Entertainment artists
Fantagio artists
Musical groups established in 2012
Musical groups from Seoul
South Korean dance music groups
South Korean girl groups
South Korean synthpop groups
Musical groups disestablished in 2019